José Carlos Moreira Varela (born 15 September 1997) is a Cape Verdean professional footballer who plays as a winger for Portuguese club Vitória Setúbal.

Club career
Varela made his professional debut with Aves in a 2-0 Primeira Liga win over on 31 March 2019.

On 16 August 2021, he signed with Vitória Setúbal.

References

External links

ZeroZero Profile

1997 births
Living people
Cape Verdean footballers
Association football wingers
C.D. Aves players
SC Mirandela players
U.D. Vilafranquense players
Leça F.C. players
Vitória F.C. players
Primeira Liga players
Liga Portugal 2 players
Campeonato de Portugal (league) players
Cape Verdean expatriate footballers
Cape Verdean expatriates in Portugal
Expatriate footballers in Portugal